Yulian Bachynsky (born March 28, 1870, Novosilka, Ternopil region – died 1940, Republic of Karelia / Leningrad region) was a Ukrainian diplomat. In 1919 he attempted to implement his idea of an independent Ukraine and went to Washington to obtain the US government's recognition of the Ukrainian People's Republic.

Education 
He studied in lviv gymnasium where lessons were taught in German. Besides, he was graduated from academic gymnasium of Lviv in 1890. After Yulian Bachynsky graduated from Lviv University's Law School, he embarked on a political and journalistic career.

Career 
Bachynsky joined the Radical Party in 1890, where he led its social-democratic wing. As early as 1899 Bachynsky was one of the co-founders of the Ukrainian Social Democratic Party. After the failure of his mission in the US, he stayed in Austria and Germany until 1934 and then decided to move to the USSR. He lived in Kharkiv, editing the Ukrainian Soviet Encyclopedia until his arrest on the trumped-up charge of membership in the Union for the Liberation of Ukraine. Sentenced to a ten-year term, he died in a prison camp in 1940 in the Republic of Karelia.

Ukraina Irredenta
Bachynsky is known as the author of "Ukraina Irredenta" (1895) - a book in which he called for Ukraine to become an independent state.

External links
 Memorandum to the government of the United States on the recognition of the Ukrainian people's republic
 Yulian Bachynsky’s struggle for Ukrainian independence
 THE ACTION UKRAINE REPORT
 The Spirit of Statehood. An unrealized project of Ukrainian conservatism

1870 births
1940 deaths
Ambassadors of Ukraine to the United States
Nonpersons in the Eastern Bloc
People from Ternopil Oblast
People from the Kingdom of Galicia and Lodomeria
Ukrainian Austro-Hungarians
Ukrainian Social Democratic Party (1899) politicians
BBK detainees
People convicted in relations with the Organization of Ukrainian Nationalists
Ukrainian people who died in prison custody
Ukrainian people who died in Soviet detention
Enforced disappearances in the Soviet Union
Union for the Freedom of Ukraine trial